Marquette is an unincorporated community in the Rural Municipality of Woodlands in the Interlake Region of Manitoba, Canada.  It is located approximately 46 kilometres (29 miles) northwest of Winnipeg.

History
The post office opened in 1871 as Baie St. Paul, changed to Marquette in 1891. The community was first noted as Marquette Station in 1882, named for French-born Jesuit missionary Jacques Marquette.

Climate
Marquette experiences a humid continental climate (Köppen Dfb) with warm to hot summers and cold winters.

Notable people 

 Aganetha Dyck (born 1937), artist

References 

Unincorporated communities in Interlake Region, Manitoba